The 2004–05 season was Burnley's 5th season in the second tier of English football. They were managed by Steve Cotterill in his first full season since he replaced Stan Ternent at the beginning of the campaign.

Appearances and goals
	
	
	
	
	

	

	

		
	
		

	

|}

Transfers

In

Out

Matches

Championship

Final league position

League Cup

4th Round

FA Cup

References

2004-05
2004–05 Football League Championship by team